Bharat Ki Shaan: Singing Star is an Indian television singing competition series broadcast on DD National. The series is produced by Gajendra Singh of Saaibaba Telefilms.

Seasons

Season 1
The Grand-Finale of the 1st season was held on 1 March 2010. The winner of the 2010 cycle was Sumit Khatri, who received a trophy and two Bajaj Discover Bikes. The 1st runner-up was Sanjeev Kumar and the 2nd runner- up was Arindam Chakrabarti.

Season 2
The second season premiered on 23 April 2012.
The winner of the 2nd season was Mamta Raut and runners up were Osama Noor and Akash Ojha. It was hosted by Manoj Tiwari. Tiwari also sang a song in movie Gangs of Wasepur. #Perwez Armaan Alam

Season 3
The third season was hosted by Manoj Tiwari again and won by Vishal Mishra. Vishal Mishra also won Bharat Ki Shaan Mahavijeta. Vibhor Parashar was the 1st runner-up in both Season 3 and Bharat Ki Shaan Mahavijeta. Amika Shail  became 2nd runner-up in Season3 and also won.

References

External links
 Bharat Ki Shaan – Synopsis

Indian reality television series
DD National original programming
Singing talent shows
Music competitions in India
Indian music television series